Nahikari Rodríguez Martínez (born January 13, 1993) is a Spanish film, theater and television actress.

Life and career 

Nahikari Rodríguez was born in Portugalete (Biscay, Basque Country) in 1993. She attended Asti Leku Ikastola. She studied the Bachelor's Degree in modern languages at the University of Deusto (2011-2015), with the thesis "Behind words: A speech act approach to Shakespeare's subtext in Macbeth".

She later studied, trained and graduated in theater, drama and acting (BA) in Ánima Eskola School of Drama with David Valdelvira, Marina Shimanskaya and Algis Arlauskas, training as a method actor, under the Stanislavsky-M.Chekhov-Grotowski-Vakhtangov methodology (Russian method), following the methodologies of the Russian classical school. She also trained in film acting with Richard Sahagún and in film acting with Eduardo Casanova.

In the years 2013–2014, she participated in the theater production Bodas de Sangre, directed by Marina Shimanskaya, playing the role of La Novia. The work was represented in different theaters, among them in the auditorium of the Montel del Prao in Jaulín, a natural amphitheater in Jaulín (Aragón).

She was part of the young theater company of Hall 6 of Bilbao. He has been part of different theatrical productions carried out in different parts of Spain, such as Los Aborigenes, together with María Cerezuela, Galerna, directed by Ramón Barea and premiered at the Teatro Arriaga, or El Trepa de Palacio, together with the actor Diego Pérez.

In 2022, she starred in the film Ahora que me voy, along with the actors Adrià Escudero, Ramon Barea, Itziar Lazkano and María Cerezuela. The film was produced by the Basque Country Film School and presented at the Santurce International Film Festival.

Private life 
She is the sister of the dancer and choreographer Lohitzune Rodríguez.

Filmograpy

Television 

 2018, Ur Handitan, ETB 1
 2015, Kantugiro, ETB 1

Film 

 2021, Ahora que me voy, dir. Nahikari Rodríguez
 2020, Muere un bañista, dir. Iñigo Cobo
 2016, Solo quería contar una historia, dir. Aritzeder Arregi
 2016, Apocalipsis G
 2016, Res, dir. Josu Angulo
 2016, Por un Puñado de Juegos, dir. Estibaliz Hierrezuelo

Stage 

 2022, El Trepa de Palacio, dir. Felipe Loza
 2022, Piztu emakumeON energia
 2018–2021, Mi Último Baile, dir. Getari Etxegarai
 2019, Galerna, dir. Ramón Barea
 2017–2019, Los Aborígenes (Lorca, Dalí y Buñuel), dir. Felipe Loza
 2013–2014, Bodas de Sangre, dir. Marina Shimanskaya
 2011, El salto y las voces, dir. Marina Shimanskaya

References

External links 

1993 births
Living people
People from Portugalete
21st-century Spanish actresses
Spanish film actresses
Spanish television actresses
Spanish stage actresses
Ánima Eskola School of Drama alumni
University of Deusto alumni
Asti Leku Ikastola alumni